Cobalt(III) hydroxide or cobaltic hydroxide is a chemical compound with formula  or .  It is an ionic compound, with trivalent cobalt cations  and hydroxyl anions .  

The compound is known in two structurally different forms, "brownish-black" and "green".  The brownish-black form is a stable solid and can be prepared by reaction of water solutions of cobalt(II) chloride and sodium hydroxide, followed by oxidation with ozone.

The green form, formerly thought to be cobalt(II) peroxide, apparently requires carbon dioxide as a catalyst. It can be prepared by adding hydrogen peroxide to a solution of cobalt(II) chloride in 96% ethanol at –30 to –35°C, then adding a 15% solution of sodium carbonate in water with intense stirring.  The resulting dark green powder is fairly stable at liquid nitrogen temperature, but at room temperature it turns dark brown within a few days.

Natural occurrence
Cobalt(III) hydroxide is unknown among the known mineral species (as of 2020). However, heterogenite, CoO(OH), is known.

See also

 Cobalt(II) hydroxide 
 Cobalt(III) oxyhydroxide

References

Cobalt(III) compounds
Hydroxides